Povilas Valinčius (born 16 May 1989 in Marijampolė) is a Lithuanian footballer who most recently played as a goalkeeper for Lithuanian A Lyga club Jonava.

Career
After departure from Petrolul Ploiești, Valinčius joined MRU Vilnius until the end of the season. He signed with A Lyga side Šiauliai in 2015 and helped them to avoid direct relegation from the league.

Afterwards goalkeeper signed a one-year deal with Atlantas.

On 11 January 2017, Povilas Valinčius joined I Lyga champions Šilas, but he didn't debuted in an official competition as team decided to retire to II Lyga and release all high-earning players after match-fixing scandal in friendlies.

Valinčius joined another A Lyga side Jonava on 12 May 2017.

References

External links
Povilas Valinčius official profile

1989 births
Living people
People from Marijampolė
Lithuanian footballers
Association football goalkeepers
FK Vėtra players
FK Sūduva Marijampolė players
FC Petrolul Ploiești players
FC Šiauliai players
FK Atlantas players
FK Šilas players
FK Jonava players
A Lyga players
Liga I players
Lithuanian expatriate footballers
Expatriate footballers in Romania
Lithuanian expatriate sportspeople in Romania